Jeremy "Jez" Butterworth (born March 1969) is an English playwright, screenwriter, and film director. He has written screenplays in collaboration with his brothers, John-Henry and Tom.

Life and career
In March 1969, Butterworth was born in London, England. He has three brothers: older brothers Tom (born 1966) and Steve (born 1968); and younger brother John-Henry (born 1976). He also has a sister, Joanna. He attended Verulam Comprehensive School, St Albans and St John's College, Cambridge. All the brothers have been active in film and theatre: Steve is a producer, while Tom and John-Henry are writers.

Butterworth's play Mojo, which premiered at the Royal Court Theatre in 1995, won the 1996 Laurence Olivier, Evening Standard, The Writer's Guild, and the George Devine awards, and the Critic's Circle Award. Butterworth also wrote and directed the film adaptation of Mojo (1997). The film featured Harold Pinter. 

Butterworth has said that Harold Pinter, 2005 Nobel Literature Laureate, has been a major influence on his work: "I know and admire Harold Pinter enormously. He has a ginormous influence on me. Conversations with him have inspired my work."

In 1999 Butterworth was one of the recipients of the V Europe Prize Theatrical Realities awarded to the Royal Court Theatre (with Sarah Kane, Mark Ravenhill, Conor McPherson, Martin McDonagh).

Butterworth co-wrote and directed the film Birthday Girl (2001), which was produced by his brother Steve and starred Nicole Kidman.

Butterworth received positive reviews of his play The Night Heron (2002), which premiered in the West End at the Royal Court Theatre. The Guardian reviewer wrote: "Can a play be simultaneously very good and very bad? I believe so." The Winterling also ran at the Royal Court in 2006. The British Theatre Guide wrote: "The Winterling can be a difficult play but contains rich veins of comedy."

In May 2007 Butterworth received the E. M. Forster Award from the American Academy of Arts and Letters.

His play Parlour Song opened in New York to "rave reviews" at the Atlantic Theatre Company, Off-Broadway in March 2008. The Almeida Theatre presented its European première in March 2009.

Butterworth's fourth play for the Royal Court Theatre was Jerusalem, which premiered in July 2009 to positive reviews. Described as a "contemporary vision of life in [England's] green and pleasant land", Jerusalem was the second important Butterworth production in London in 2009. The production starred Mark Rylance as Johnny Byron, and featured Mackenzie Crook as Ginger in a supporting role. It was a sell-out at the Royal Court, won the Evening Standard Theatre Award and Critics' Circle Theatre Award for the best play of 2009 and, with the same cast, transferred to the Apollo Theatre on Shaftesbury Avenue in January 2010. 

Jerusalem opened on Broadway in April 2011, with many of the original UK cast. It returned to London later that year, again playing at the Apollo. In January 2014 Jerusalem opened at the San Francisco Playhouse, where it also received rave reviews. Jerusalem was nominated for the 2011 Tony Award, Play. Mark Rylance won the 2011 Tony Award for Best Performance by an Actor in a Play.

Jez and John-Henry Butterworth were named recipients of the Writers Guild of America West's 2011 Paul Selvin Award for their screenplay for the film Fair Game (2010), directed by Doug Liman and starring Naomi Watts and Sean Penn.

On 26 October 2012, Butterworth's play The River opened at the Royal Court Theatre, starring Dominic West, Laura Donnelly and Miranda Raison, with an appearance by Gillian Saker. The River had its US premiere on Broadway at the Circle in the Square Theatre in a limited engagement in October 2014, starring Hugh Jackman and directed by Ian Rickson. Reception was positive, with London critics finding the work "lyrical", "beautifully written" and "suffuse[d] with wonder and beauty".

The Ferryman
Butterworth's play The Ferryman opened at the Royal Court Theatre in April 2017. Directed by Sam Mendes, it became the fastest selling play in the Royal Court Theatre's history. Set in rural Derry in 1981 and focusing on the events surrounding the deaths of the IRA hunger strikers, it received 15 five-star reviews, including all the major UK papers. The Irish Times said, "Although Butterworth is English, The Ferryman feels like a thoroughly Irish play, not only because there is not a single false note in the dialogue." The Huffington Post said that it was "one of the two or three greatest plays of the decade". But, The Guardians Sean O'Hagan wrote, "I'm from Northern Ireland and it doesn't ring true", and it was "so close to a cultural stereotype as to be offensive". Two weeks later The Irish Times printed an opinion piece by actor Gerard Lee (of Father Ted) entitled "In defence of The Ferryman". He challenged negative comments, calling the play "layered and powerful".

The Ferryman won the 2017 Evening Standard Award for Best Play, the 2018 Critics' Circle Award for Best New Play, the 2018 WhatsOnStage Award for Best New Play, and the 2018 Olivier Award for Best New Play. It has played for over 350 performances at the Gielgud Theatre and transferred to Broadway in October 2018. The play won the 2019 Drama Desk Award for Outstanding Play and Tony Award for Best Play.

Work
Plays

Mojo (1995) Royal Court Theatre
The Night Heron (2002)
The Winterling (2006)
Parlour Song (2008)
Jerusalem (2009) Royal Court Theatre
The River (2012)
The Ferryman (2017) Royal Court Theatre

Television
Night of the Golden Brain (1993)
Christmas (1996)
Britannia (2018)
Mammals (2022)

Film
Mojo (1997) (also directed)
Birthday Girl (2001) co-wrote with Tom Butterworth (also directed)
The Last Legion (2007), co-wrote with Tom Butterworth
Fair Game (2010), co-wrote with John-Henry Butterworth
Edge of Tomorrow (2014), co-wrote with Christopher McQuarrie and John-Henry Butterworth
Get on Up (2014), co-wrote with John-Henry Butterworth
Black Mass (2015) co-wrote with Mark Mallouk
Spectre (2015) co-wrote with John Logan, Neal Purvis and Robert Wade
Ford v Ferrari (2019), co-wrote with John-Henry Butterworth and Jason Keller
Cruella (2021) (uncredited script doctoring)
Flag Day (2021), co-wrote with John-Henry Butterworth
Indiana Jones and the Dial of Destiny (2023), co-writing with John-Henry Butterworth and James Mangold

Awards and nominations

References

External links

1969 births
Alumni of St John's College, Cambridge
Critics' Circle Theatre Award winners
English screenwriters
English male screenwriters
Laurence Olivier Award winners
Living people
Writers from London
Film directors from London
Tony Award winners
English male dramatists and playwrights
20th-century English dramatists and playwrights
21st-century English dramatists and playwrights
20th-century English male writers
21st-century English male writers